Lufthansa Cargo operates flights to the following destinations as of May 2021.

Africa

Eastern Africa
 
 Nairobi - Jomo Kenyatta International Airport

Southern Africa
 
 Windhoek - Hosea Kutako International Airport
 
 Johannesburg - O. R. Tambo International Airport

Western Africa 
 
 Dakar - Léopold Sédar Senghor International Airport

Americas

Caribbean 
 
 Aguadilla - Rafael Hernández Airport

North America 
 
 Toronto - Toronto Pearson International Airport
 
 Guadalajara - Guadalajara International Airport
 Mexico City - Mexico City International Airport
 
 Atlanta - Hartsfield–Jackson Atlanta International Airport
 Boston - Logan International Airport
 Chicago - O'Hare International Airport
 Dallas - Dallas/Fort Worth International Airport
 Denver - Denver International Airport
 Detroit - Detroit Metropolitan Airport
 Los Angeles - Los Angeles International Airport
 New York City - John F. Kennedy International Airport

South America 
 
 Buenos Aires - Ministro Pistarini International Airport
 
 Campinas - Viracopos International Airport
 Curitiba - Afonso Pena International Airport
 Petrolina - Petrolina Airport
 Natal - Greater Natal International Airport
 Manaus - Eduardo Gomes International Airport
 Recife - Recife/Guararapes–Gilberto Freyre International Airport
 Rio de Janeiro - Rio de Janeiro/Galeão International Airport
 
 Bogotá - El Dorado International Airport
 
 Quito - Mariscal Sucre International Airport
 
 Montevideo - Carrasco International Airport

Central America 
 
 Guatemala City - La Aurora International Airport (Begins soon)

Asia

Central Asia 
 
 Almaty - Almaty International Airport
 
 Ashgabat - Ashgabat International Airport
 
 Tashkent - Islam Karimov Tashkent International Airport

East Asia 
 
 Beijing - Beijing Capital International Airport
 Chengdu - Chengdu Shuangliu International Airport
 Guangzhou - Guangzhou Baiyun International Airport
 Nanjing - Nanjing Lukou International Airport
 Shanghai - Shanghai Pudong International Airport
 Shenyang - Shenyang Taoxian International Airport
 Shenzhen - Shenzhen Bao'an International Airport
 
 Hong Kong - Hong Kong International Airport
 
 Osaka - Kansai International Airport
 Tokyo - Narita International Airport
 
 Seoul - Incheon International Airport

South Asia 
 
 Bangalore - Kempegowda International Airport
 Chennai - Chennai International Airport
 Delhi - Indira Gandhi International Airport
 Hyderabad - Rajiv Gandhi International Airport Hub
 Kolkata - Netaji Subhash Chandra Bose International Airport
 Mumbai - Chhatrapati Shivaji Maharaj International Airport

Southeast Asia 
 
 Jakarta - Soekarno–Hatta International Airport
 
 Bangkok - Suvarnabhumi Airport

Southwest Asia 
 
 Manama - Bahrain International Airport
 
 Tehran - Tehran Imam Khomeini International Airport
 
 Tel Aviv - Ben Gurion Airport 
 
 Jeddah - King Abdulaziz International Airport
 Riyadh - King Khalid International Airport
 
 Sharjah - Sharjah International Airport Hub

Europe

Eastern Europe 
 
 Moscow - Domodedovo International Airport
 Novosibirsk - Tolmachevo Airport hub

Northern Europe 
 
 Harstad - Harstad/Narvik Airport, Evenes
 Stavanger - Stavanger Airport, Sola

Southern Europe 
 
 Athens - Athens International Airport
 
 Madrid - Adolfo Suárez Madrid–Barajas Airport
 
 Istanbul - Istanbul Airport

Western Europe 
 
 Dublin - Dublin Airport
 
 Amsterdam - Amsterdam Airport Schiphol
 
 Frankfurt - Frankfurt Airport Hub
 
 Birmingham - Birmingham Airport
 London
 London Heathrow International Airport

See also
AeroLogic

References

External links 

Lists of airline destinations
Destinations